Walter J. Stachnik is a former Inspector General of the U.S. Securities and Exchange Commission (SEC). Stachnik was the first Inspector General of the SEC, having been in the position from the time the job was created in 1989. He retired in 2007, after 30 years in government service.

References

Living people
Place of birth missing (living people)
U.S. Securities and Exchange Commission personnel
Year of birth missing (living people)